Shamrock Township may refer to the following places in the United States:

 Shamrock Township, Aitkin County, Minnesota
 Shamrock Township, Callaway County, Missouri
 Shamrock Township, Holt County, Nebraska

See also

Shamrock (disambiguation)

Township name disambiguation pages